Klein cubic can refer to:

Klein cubic surface
Klein cubic threefold